Warley East was a parliamentary constituency in the borough of Sandwell in the West Midlands of England.

It returned one Member of Parliament (MP) to the House of Commons of the Parliament of the United Kingdom.  It was created for the February 1974 general election, and abolished for the 1997 general election, when it was largely replaced by the new Warley constituency.

The largest town in the constituency was Smethwick.

History
The constituency's only MP for its 23-year existence was the actor Andrew Faulds, previously Labour MP for the former constituency of Smethwick since 1966.

Boundaries
1974–1983: The County Borough of Warley wards of Abbey, Bearwood, Brandhall, Bristnall, Sandwell, Soho, Uplands, and Victoria.

1983–1997: The Metropolitan Borough of Sandwell wards of Abbey, Bristnall, Old Warley, St Paul's, Smethwick, and Soho and Victoria.

Members of Parliament

Elections

Elections in the 1970s

Elections in the 1980s

Elections in the 1990s

Notes and references 

Politics of Sandwell
Parliamentary constituencies in the West Midlands (county) (historic)
Constituencies of the Parliament of the United Kingdom established in 1974
Constituencies of the Parliament of the United Kingdom disestablished in 1997